Valdur is an Estonian masculine given name.

As of 1 January 2021, 555 men in Estonia have the first name Valdur, making it the 255th most popular male name in the country. The name is most commonly found in Valga County, where 9.29 per 10,000 men bear the name. Notable people bearing the name include:

Valdur Helm (born 1938), conductor, pedagogue and music teacher 
Valdur Himbek (1925–1991), film director and actor
Valdur Lahtvee (born 1958), politician
Valdur Mikita (born 1970), writer and semiotician 
Valdur Ohmann (born 1958), historian and archivist
Valdur Paakspuu (1934–1991), ornithologist and nature conservationist

References

Masculine given names
Estonian masculine given names